The 1st Guards 'Vienna' Order of Lenin Order of Kutuzov Mechanized Corps was a Red Army armoured formation that saw service during World War II on the Eastern Front.  After the war it continued to serve with Soviet occupation forces in Central Europe. It was originally the 1st Guards Rifle Division. The unit had approximately the same size and combat power as an early-war Wehrmacht Panzer Division, or a British Armoured Division during World War II.

It was under the command of General Lieutenant Ivan Russiyanov, and gained the honorifics "Vienna, Voronezh".

In its final form, as the 171st Guards District Training Centre, it was disbanded while being stationed in Tbilisi in 1992.

History 
The 1st Guards Mechanized Corps was formed in November 1942 in the Tambov region during the re-establishment of the Mechanized Corps as a formation in the Red Army.  It was then assigned to the Southwestern Front which was under the command of General N. F. Vatutin to participate in the encirclement of German Army Group A in Operation Saturn, which was undertaken during the Battle of Stalingrad.

The corps consisted of the following units:

Combat Units
 1st Guards Mechanized Rifle Brigade
 2nd Guards Mechanized Rifle Brigade
 3rd Guards Mechanized Rifle Brigade
 16th, 17th, 18th, 19th Guards Tank Regiments (combined into the 9th Guards Tank Brigade by 1945)
 116th Guards Artillery Regiment
 1504th Guards Anti-Tank Regiment
 267th Mortar Regiment
 407th Guards Mortar Battalion

Support Units
 54th Guards Signalling Battalion
 Corps Train

Changes to unit organization
The 116th Guards Artillery Regiment had been replaced by the 382nd Guards, 1453rd, and 1821st self-propelled gun regiments by 1945.
The 1504th Guards Anti-Tank Regiment was no longer with the corps in 1945.
The 11th Guards Motorcycle Battalion and 1699th Anti-Aircraft Regiment had been added to the corps by 1945.

In 1942, the corps fought in Operation Saturn; in 1943, the Third Battle Of Kharkov, the Battle of Kursk,  Operation Polkovodets Rumyantsev, and the Battle of the lower Dnepr, and in 1945, the Battle of Budapest, the  Balaton Defensive Operation, and the Vienna Offensive. 

Depending on the specific tasks allotted, units from the Reserve of the Supreme High Command (Stavka reserve) could be added to help it achieve its mission.  When the 1st Guards Mechanized Corps returned to the front in January 1945, its tank formations were completely equipped with American M4A2 Sherman Lend-Lease tanks.

The Corps had been re-designated the 1st Guards Mechanised Division by March 1946 and served in the Transcaucasian Military District before being reorganised as the 2nd Guards Motor Rifle Division in 1957, 2nd Guards MR Training in 1960, and then the 16th Guards MRD on 17 November 1964 (Military Unit Number 35695). On 18 August 1968 renamed 100th Guards Training Motorised Rifle Division. At some point afterwards, probably in the late 1980s, it was renamed the 171st Guards District Training Centre. 

On September 7, 1985, the division was named after Lieutenant General I.N. Russiyanov. Since 1987, the division began to be called the 171st Guards District Training Center (Military Unit Number 30105). It was based in Tbilisi throughout the postwar period. In June 1992, after the collapse of the USSR, it was disbanded. Remaining Russian units in that location gained the designation of the 137th Military Base.

Yet that same month, the battle banner of the division, its honours and awards were transferred to the 212th District Training Centre in Chita, Zabaykalsky Krai, Far Eastern Military District (Military Unit 30672). Up until 1987 the 212th DTC had been the 49th Tank Training Division. With the change, the centre in Chita became the 212th Guards District Training Center "Vienna of the Orders of Lenin and Kutuzov," for junior specialists named after Lieutenant General I.N. Russiyanov.

Assignment

1942
 Southwestern Front
 3rd Guards Army

1943
 Southwestern Front

1944
 STAVKA Reserve, later part of the Kharkov Military District

1945
 3rd Ukrainian Front

Bibliography
 Bonn, K.E. 'Slaughterhouse - The Handbook of the Eastern Front', Aberjona Press
 Erickson, J. 'The Road to Stalingrad'
 Glantz, D. 'From the Don to the Dnepr'

References

External links
 Red Army Studies
 Battlefield.ru
 Eastern Front.co.uk
 Lost Battalion Games Article

G001
Military units and formations established in 1942
Military units and formations disestablished in 1946